The Progressive Conservative Party of Manitoba is a centre-right political party in Manitoba, Canada. It is currently the governing party in the Legislative Assembly of Manitoba, after winning a substantial majority in the 2016 election and maintaining a majority in the 2019 election.

Origins and early years
The origins of the party lie at the end of the nineteenth century. Party politics were weak in Manitoba for several years after it entered Canadian confederation in 1870. The system of government was essentially one of non-partisan democracy, though some leading figures such as Marc-Amable Girard were identified with the Conservatives at the federal level. The government was a balance of ethnic, religious and linguistic communities, and party affiliation was at best a secondary concern.

In 1879, Thomas Scott (not to be confused with another person of the same name who was executed by Louis Riel's provisional government in 1870) and Joseph Royal attempted to introduce partisan politics into the province. Both were Conservatives, and both believed that they could lead a provincial Conservative Party. Their plans were thwarted by Premier John Norquay, who also supported the Conservatives at the federal level but included both Liberals and Conservatives in his governing alliance.

Norquay himself formed a reluctant alliance with the provincial Conservatives in 1882, in the face of strong opposition from Thomas Greenway's Provincial Rights Party. His government was for all intents and purposes Conservative for the remainder of its time in office, though Norquay continued to describe it as "non-partisan". Starting in the election of 1883, moreover, political parties began to be listed on the provincial election ballot.

Subsequent development of the party (to 1899)
When Norquay resigned as Premier in 1887, his successor David H. Harrison also became leader of the Conservative parliamentary caucus. Norquay was able to reclaim the latter position early in 1888, following an extremely divided meeting of senior Conservative politicians. By this time, the new Liberal Premier Thomas Greenway had formally introduced party government to the province, and no one doubted that Norquay was now the province's Conservative leader.

The Conservative Party was not yet a legally recognized institution in the province, however, and began to lose its coherence again after Norquay's death in 1889. Conservative MLAs simply referred to themselves as "the opposition" for most of the decade that followed. Rodmond Roblin was the dominant Conservative MLA between 1890 and 1892, but he does not seem to have been recognized as an official leader.

After Roblin's defeat in the election of 1892, William Alexander Macdonald became the leader of the opposition. In 1893, his election for Brandon City was declared invalid, and he lost the subsequent by-election. Remarkably, the election of Macdonald's successor, John Andrew Davidson, was also voided in 1894. For the remainder of this parliament, James Fisher seems to have been the leading figure in the opposition ranks. It is not clear if he was formally recognized as "leader of the opposition", or even as an official member of the Conservative Party.

Rodmond Roblin was re-elected in 1896, and officially became opposition leader in the legislature. The next year, Hugh John Macdonald (son of former prime minister John A. Macdonald) became the party's official leader, while Roblin continued to lead the opposition in parliament.

Taking power (1899–1915)
The Conservative Party became an official entity in 1899, and drew up its first election platform in the same year. It promised a board of education for the province, the creation of agricultural and technical colleges, and government ownership of railways.

Hugh John Macdonald became Premier following in the 1899 election, but resigned shortly thereafter to re-enter federal politics. Rodmond Roblin succeeded Macdonald, and ruled the province for fifteen years. Roblin's government was progressively oriented, negotiated the extension of the railway, bought Manitoba's Bell telephone operations in order to establish a government run system, introduced corporate taxation, and created a public utilities commission while running a budgetary surplus. It was less progressive on social issues, however, and is most frequently remembered today for its opposition to women's suffrage.

The Tories were brought down in 1915 by a scandal involving the construction of the province's new legislative buildings. Roblin was forced to resign as Premier, and James Aikins led the party to a disastrous loss later in the year.

The Manitoba Conservatives received their greatest support from the francophone community in the 1915 election, because the party was seen as more supportive than the Liberals of francophone education rights. This was a pronounced contrast to the situation in federal politics, where most francophone Canadians opposed the war policies of Prime Minister Robert Borden.

In the political wilderness (1915–1940)
Aime Benard was chosen as leader pro tem of the party on August 15, 1915, and Albert Prefontaine was chosen as the official parliamentary leader shortly thereafter. The party was a minor force in parliament, however, and was largely sidelined by the radical farmer and labour movements of the late 1910s.

On November 6, 1919, the Conservative Party chose farmer R.G. Willis to lead the party into its next electoral campaign. Willis's selection was a response to the provincial victory of the United Farmers of Ontario the previous month; he defeated Major Fawcett Taylor after three other candidates (including Prefontaine) withdrew their names. The vote total was not announced.

Willis was defeated in the election of 1920, and the Conservatives became the fourth-largest group in parliament with only six seats. John Thomas Haig subsequently became their parliamentary leader, and Fawcett Taylor was chosen as the official party leader in early 1922.

The Conservatives gradually regained support in the following twenty years, but were unable to defeat the Progressive government of John Bracken. In 1932, Bracken's Progressives formed an alliance with the Manitoba Liberal Party to ensure that Taylor would not become the province's Premier.

Taylor resigned as party leader in 1933, and W. Sanford Evans served as parliamentary leader for the next three years. In 1936, Errick Willis (son of R.G.) was acclaimed as party leader. He led the party in another unsuccessful challenge to the Bracken ministry in 1936.

In coalition (1940–1950)
In 1940 Willis agreed to join Bracken in a wartime coalition government. Willis himself was given a prominent cabinet position in the all-party ministry which followed.

Three anti-coalition Conservatives were elected to the legislature in 1941. One of these, Huntly Ketchen, served as leader of the opposition. This group did not constitute a rival to the official Conservative Party, however.

In 1946, the party changed its name to the Progressive Conservative Party of Manitoba to reflect the change in name of the federal Progressive Conservatives. Relations between the Tories and Liberal-Progressives deteriorated after Douglas Campbell became Premier in 1948, and the Tories voted 215–7 to leave the coalition in 1950.

Varying fortunes (1953–1975)
The 1953 election was won by the Liberals, and Willis was compelled to accept a leadership challenge the following year. Duff Roblin, grandson of Rodmond Roblin, became party leader on the second ballot and rebuilt the party's organization which had been weakened during the coalition period.

In 1958, Roblin's Tories ran and were elected to a minority government on a progressive platform of increased education grants, crop insurance, extension of hydro to the north, and road construction.  Remarkably, his platform was well to the left of that of Campbell's Liberal-Progressives.  In 1959, Roblin returned to the polls and won a majority, which pursued a policy of 'social investment', active government and social reform (including reintroducing French to schools and expanding welfare services). In 1967, Roblin left provincial politics and was replaced by Walter Weir, a member of the party's rural conservative wing.  Weir led a somewhat more cautious and restrained government, and was defeated by the New Democratic Party under Edward Schreyer in 1969. Sidney Spivak, a Red Tory like Roblin, led the party from 1971 to 1975, but was unable to defeat Schreyer's government.

The party under Sterling Lyon (1975–1981)
Sterling Lyon became leader of the party in 1975 and took it in a more conservative direction, anticipating the neoconservatism of Margaret Thatcher, Ronald Reagan and Mike Harris. The Lyon Tories defeated the NDP in 1977. The Lyon government was to the right of previous Tory administrations and implemented a program of spending cuts and reduced taxes (while also promoting mega-projects in the energy sector). Manitobans were unreceptive to the government's conservatism, and turned it out of office in 1981 after only one term, bringing the NDP back to power.

The party under Gary Filmon (1983–1999)
Gary Filmon became leader of the Progressive Conservatives in 1983, and formed a minority government in 1988 after defeating the NDP. Filmon's Tories remained in power for three terms, winning a majority government in 1990 and again in 1995.

Filmon's government avoided excessive conservative rhetoric, but nonetheless reduced corporate taxes, mandated balanced budgets, and limited the power of teacher's and nurse's unions. It supported the Charlottetown Accord (a proposal for amending the Canadian constitution), as well as free trade with the United States. The party's financial austerity program resulted in a balanced budget in 1995, the first in 20 years.

The Tories were hurt in the late 1990s by increased unemployment, a vote-manipulation scandal from the 1995 election (see Independent Native Voice), and the decline of the Manitoba Liberal Party. The latter development allowed the anti-Tory vote to coalesce around the NDP.  Ahead of the 1999 election, Filmon announced that his government would undertake a shift further to the right if reelected.  The voters were not receptive to this, and ousted the Tories in favour of the NDP.

Return to the wilderness (1999–2016)
Filmon resigned as leader in 2000, and was replaced by Stuart Murray. The party fell to twenty seats in the election of 2003, its worst showing since 1953.

On November 5, 2005, at a meeting regarding a possible leadership convention in the near future, Stuart Murray received only 45% support from party members. On November 14, Stuart Murray stepped down as leadership of the party. Hugh McFadyen became leader of the party at the leadership convention on April 29, 2006 garnering two thirds of the first ballot vote.

In McFadyen's first campaign as party leader during the 2007 provincial election, popular support for PC Party rose two percent over 2003 numbers. Although he managed to capture a greater percentage of the provincial vote, the Tories lost one seat.

After failing to make major gains in the 2011 provincial election McFadyen agreed to step down as leader. On July 30, 2012, former federal MP and Filmon cabinet minister Brian Pallister was acclaimed as leader.

Pallister as Premier (2016–2021)
By the time the writs were dropped for the 2016 provincial election, the Manitoba Tories had been leading in opinion polls for almost four years, and were heavily favoured to win.  As expected, Pallister led the party to a decisive victory. The Tories won 40 out of 57 seats, the largest majority government in the province's history.

Pallister was re-elected to a majority government in 2019.

Pallister announced his resignation on August 10, 2021, and confirmed on August 29, 2021 his departure would take place on September 1, 2021. His interim successor as party leader was confirmed as Kelvin Goertzen on 31 August, 2021. An elected successor as party leader will be determined in a leadership election on October 30.

Goertzen as Premier (2021)
Kelvin Goertzen was sworn in as premier of Manitoba, on September 1, 2021. He would serve until November 2, 2021 and resigned shortly before PC leader Heather Stefanson was appointed and sworn in as his successor later that day.

Stefanson as Premier (2021–present)
Heather Stefanson was sworn in as premier on November 2, 2021.

Leaders of the party
John Norquay, October 1878 – December 1887 (Premier: 1878–1887)
David Howard Harrison, December 1887 – July 1889 (Premier: 1887–1888)
Rodmond Roblin, July 1889 – March 1897 (house leader)
Hugh John Macdonald, March 1897 – October 1900 (Premier: 1900)
Rodmond Roblin, October 1900 – May 1915 (Premier: 1900–1915)
Sir James Aikins, May 1915 – January 1916
Albert Prefontaine, January 1916 – November 6, 1919
R.G. Willis, November 6, 1919 – April 5, 1922
Fawcett Taylor, April 5, 1922 – April 1933
W. Sanford Evans, April 1933 – June 1936
Errick Willis, June 1936 – June 1954
Dufferin Roblin, June 1954 – November 1967 (Premier: 1958–1967)
Walter Weir, November 1967 – February 1971 (Premier: 1967–1969)
Sidney Spivak, February 1971 – December 1975
Sterling Lyon, December 1975 – December 1983 (Premier: 1977–1981)
Gary Filmon, December 1983 – May 29, 2000 (Premier: 1988–1999)
Bonnie Mitchelson, May 29, 2000 – November 2000 (interim)
Stuart Murray, November 2000 – April 2006
Hugh McFadyen, April 2006 – July 30, 2012
Brian Pallister, July 30, 2012 – September 1, 2021 (Premier: 2016–2021)
Kelvin Goertzen, September 1, 2021 – October 30, 2021 (interim) (Premier: 2021)
Heather Stefanson, October 30, 2021 – present (Premier: 2021–present)

Note:  John Thomas Haig led the Manitoba Conservatives in the legislature from 1920 to 1922.

Election results

1Includes 7 Liberal-Conservatives
2Includes 3 Liberal-Conservatives

See also

List of Manitoba general elections
Progressive Conservative Party of Manitoba candidates in the 1977 Manitoba provincial election
Progressive Conservative Party of Manitoba leadership elections

References

External links
 

Conservative parties in Canada
Organizations based in Winnipeg
Provincial political parties in Manitoba
1882 establishments in Manitoba
Political parties established in 1882